Radostina Rangelova-Chitigoi (Bulgarian: Радостина Рангелова - Цитигой) (born ), formerly Radostina Gradeva, is a Bulgarian female former volleyball player, playing as an outside-spiker. She was part of the Bulgaria women's national volleyball team.

She competed at the 2001 Women's European Volleyball Championship.

She competed at the 2009 Women's European Volleyball Championship. On club level she played for Tomis Constanza in 2009. Rangelova was formerly married to Georgi Gradev, a football agent.

References

External links
http://www.cev.lu/Competition-Area/PlayerDetails.aspx?TeamID=5157&PlayerID=5428&ID=366
http://www.legavolleyfemminile.it/?page_id=194&idat=RAN-RAD-78
cev.lu
todor66

1978 births
Living people
Bulgarian women's volleyball players
Place of birth missing (living people)
Outside hitters